Malaysian Han Studies (abbreviated as MAHANS), is a non-profit, private educational institution in Bukit Katil, Malacca, Malaysia which promotes the Chinese Traditional Moral Values.

Course Contents 
Di-zi-gui
Supplement course materials: book of Filial Piety; Moral stories from ancient China; Book of Rites-Book of Education; The Analects; Five Books of Ancient Codes of Conducts; Changing Destiny; and famous ancient Chinese sayings
Music and Singing Classes
Healthy diet for 21 century
Foundation In Sinology Chinese Studies - Collaboration with University of Wales Trinity Saint David

Lecture Series 
Talks: Schools, business, governmental officials, National Service, NGOs
Empowerment Courses
Happy Life Workshops
Translation and Training Programs conducted in English and Malay
Publications and media presentations
Publish and print books, as well as produce films that are based on themes of courtesy, filial piety, sibling rapport, proper superior-subordinate relations, integrity, justice and honesty.

Partner Institutions 
 United Kingdom
University of Wales Trinity Saint David

References

External links 
 Malaysian Han Studies Official Website
 University of Wales Trinity Saint David Academy of Sinology Official Website

Colleges in Malaysia
Universities and colleges in Malacca
Education schools in Malaysia
Educational institutions established in 2009
2009 establishments in Malaysia
Malaysian educational websites